Minam State Recreation Area is a state park in the U.S. state of Oregon. Administered by the Oregon Parks and Recreation Department, it covers about  along the Wallowa River north of La Grande in Wallowa County.

The park, generally open all year, has 22 primitive campsites, restrooms, a boat ramp, and a walking trail. Visitors may picnic, go boating on the river, or fish for steelhead. Wildlife in the area includes deer, bear, elk, and an occasional cougar or bighorn sheep.

See also
 List of Oregon state parks

References

State parks of Oregon
Parks in Wallowa County, Oregon